Shewrapara metro station (romanised: Sheorapara metro steshen) is a metro station of the Dhaka Metro's MRT Line 6. This station is located in Shewrapara, Dhaka. It is estimated that the station will be opened on 26 March 2023.

Station

Station layout

References

Dhaka Metro stations